The Parliamentary Network on the World Bank & International Monetary Fund (French: Réseau parlementaire sur la Banque mondiale et le FMI) is an independent inter-parliamentary organization aiming to increase transparency and accountability in international financial institutions., notably the World Bank Group and the International Monetary Fund. It consists of over a thousand legislators from 158 World Bank Group and IMF member countries.

History

The Parliamentary Network on the World Bank & IMF was founded in 2000 as an independent, non-governmental organization providing a platform for advocacy for Parliamentarians from IMF and World Bank member countries;. The Network has formed partnerships with numerous organizations, including: the World Bank, the IMF, the OECD, the Inter-Parliamentary Union, GOPAC, GLOBE, Transparency International, etc.

Structure and governance

The Parliamentary Network is governed by the Board of Directors currently composed of 10 members elected every two years. The members of the Board represent the regions of MENA, Europe, Africa, Latin America, East Asia, and World Bank donor countries. Membership in the Network is open to all elected or nominated parliamentarians from World Bank and IMF member states who currently hold a mandate.

The International Secretariat of the Network is based in Paris, France.

Objectives

The Parliamentary Network on the World Bank & IMF is principally focused on increasing transparency and accountability of the World Bank Group and the International Monetary Fund by:

 Strengthening the understanding of the work of the World Bank Group and International Monetary Fund among parliamentarians
 Providing a channel for parliamentarians to inform the World Bank Group and IMF of legislative priorities on behalf of their constituents
 Ensuring that the voice of parliamentarians is heard on the subjects in which the WBG and IMF have a key role
 Conducting research and share information among members on topics which are of international concern and interest

Activities

Global Parliamentary Conference (GPC)

Every year, the Parliamentary Network on the World Bank & IMF organizes, jointly with the World Bank Group and the International Monetary Fund, the Global Parliamentary Conference. The conference brings together legislators, the IMF and World Bank leadership.

Field Visits

The Parliamentary Network  organizes visits for parliamentarians to on-the-ground development projects supported by the World Bank and the IMF. To this day, its members have participated in visits to Albania, Burkina Faso, Burundi, Cambodia, Democratic Republic of the Congo, Ethiopia, Ghana, Haiti, Indonesia, Kenya, Laos, Madagascar, Mongolia, Montenegro, Mozambique, Nicaragua, Nigeria, Peru, Rwanda, Serbia, Sri Lanka, Tanzania, Uganda, Vietnam and Yemen.

Chapters

National and regional chapters are parliamentary discussion groups organized by a local initiative which aim to strengthen the position of parliamentarians among international financial institutions and other development stakeholders and facilitate regular interaction between local and regional legislators and staff in World Bank and IMF country offices, including consultations on Country Assistance Strategies, Public Expenditure Reviews, World Bank and IMF policies and programmes

Special events

The Parliamentary Network regularly participates in a number of special events including global summits, parliamentary assembly caucuses and economic briefing sessions.

References

External links
 Official website
 World Bank and parliamentarians
 IMF Legislators
 2017 Global Parliamentary Conference

International political organizations
Accountability